Anne-Marie "Ana" Padurariu (born August 1, 2002) is a Canadian artistic gymnast and the 2018 World Championships silver medalist on balance beam.

Early life 
Ana Padurariu is of Romanian descent. Born in Bracebridge, Ontario, she resides in Whitby. She attended Sinclair Secondary School.

Padurariu's club is Gemini Gymnastics (located in Oshawa, Ontario), where she took up gymnastics at the age of four. Her favorite apparatus are beam and floor. Her dream is to compete at the 2020 Tokyo Olympic Games, just as former Gemini Gymnastics gymnast Kristina Vaculik did in London in 2012.

Gymnastics career

Junior
As a junior, in 2016–2017 Padurariu won every gold (five gold medals, the all-around and all four apparatus events) at the 2016 Olympic Hopes Cup, the 2017 Elite Canada, and the 2017 Canadian Artistic Gymnastics Championships and four golds (except on vault) at the 2016 Pan American Artistic Gymnastics Championships. She also did well at two international events, the City of Jesolo Trophy (Italy) and the Gymnix Junior Cup (Montreal, Canada). As a result, she was named Gymnastics Canada's junior athlete of 2017.

Senior

2018 
Padurariu debuted at the senior level at the 2018 Elite Canada, winning the all-around silver. She was leading after three events, but fell on vault. Later she learned that she had two fractures in her left foot.

In September 2018, Padurariu was part of the Canadian team that finished in fourth place in the team competition at the 2018 senior Pan American Artistic Gymnastics Championship.

Padurariu was included in the Canadian team for the 2018 World Artistic Gymnastics Championships in Doha, Qatar, where she helped Canada to its best-ever fourth place in the team event, and qualified in fifth place for the final on balance beam. In the beam final, she won silver with 14.100 points, behind Liu Tingting of China with 14.533 points and ahead of Simone Biles of the United States with 13.600 points. It was only the fourth worlds medal in the history of Canadian women's artistic gymnastics. Padurariu is also her country's second-ever world medalist on beam.

2019 
In March Padurariu competed at the Stuttgart World Cup. She finished in second place behind Simone Biles.  In May she competed at the Canadian National Championships.  After the first day of competition Padurariu was leading, but a fall off the balance beam on the second day allowed Ellie Black to take the gold, leaving Padurariu with the silver.  Additionally she won gold on uneven bars, silver on balance beam behind Brooklyn Moors, and bronze on floor exercise behind Black and Moors.

In June Padurariu was named to the team to compete at the 2019 Pan American Games alongside Black, Moors, Shallon Olsen, and Victoria-Kayen Woo.  She later had to pull out after sustaining another fracture to her left foot.

On September 4 Padurariu was named to the team to compete at the 2019 World Championships in Stuttgart, Germany alongside Black, Olsen, Moors, and Woo. Due to her injury, Padruariu competed only on bars and beam in the qualification round, where she helped Canada qualify to the team final and individually qualified to the balance beam final. Canada placed seventh overall. In the event finals Padurariu competed on balance beam only but fell on her triple wolf turn.

In October Padurariu announced on Instagram that she had verbally committed to attend UCLA on a gymnastics scholarship.  A month later she signed her National Letter of Intent with the Bruins, starting in the 2020–21 school year.

2020 
In late January it was announced that Padurariu would compete at the Stuttgart World Cup taking place in March.  In early February it was announced that she would also compete at the Birmingham World Cup taking place in late March.  Her first competition of the season was Elite Canada, where she placed first in the all-around, ahead of Brooklyn Moors.  The Stuttgart World Cup was later canceled due to the COVID-19 pandemic in Germany as was the Birmingham World Cup due to the COVID-19 pandemic in the United Kingdom.

Competitive history

References

External links 
 Ana Padurariu at Gymnastics Canada
 

2002 births
Living people
Canadian female artistic gymnasts
Canadian people of Romanian descent
Medalists at the World Artistic Gymnastics Championships
People from Bracebridge, Ontario
Sportspeople from Ontario
UCLA Bruins women's gymnasts
21st-century Canadian women